Petite Blonde is the name of a live jazz collaboration album. It features Victor Bailey on bass, Dennis Chambers on drums, Mitch Forman on keyboards, Chuck Loeb on guitar, and Bill Evans on saxophone (soprano and tenor). It was recorded live on July 4, 1992 at the Neuwied Jazzfestival and on July 14, 1992 at The Fabrik in Hamburg, Germany.

Track listing

1992 live albums